Nikolai Maximovich Günther (also transliterated as Nicholas M. Gunther or N. M. Gjunter) ( – May 4, 1941) was a Russian mathematician known for his work in potential theory and in  integral and partial differential equations: later studies have uncovered his contributions to the theory of Gröbner bases.

He was an Invited Speaker of the ICM in 1924 at Toronto, in 1928 at Bologna, and in 1932 at Zurich.

Selected publications
. A large paper aimed at showing the applications of Radon integrals to problems of mathematical physics: the Mathematical Reviews review refers to a 1949 reprint published by the Chelsea Publishing Company.
.
.

See also
Harmonic function
Integral equation
Radon measure

Notes

References

Biographical and general references
. The "Mathematics in the USSR during its first thirty years 1917–1947" is an opus describing the developments of Soviet mathematics during the first thirty years of its existence. It consists of several survey articles, authored by Soviet experts and reviewing briefly the contributions of Soviet mathematicians to a chosen field during the years from 1917 to 1947: it was later expanded as the two volume survey (Kurosh et al. 1959a, 1959b).
. The "Mathematics in the USSR during its first forty years 1917–1957" is an opus in two volumes describing the developments of Soviet mathematics during the first forty years of its existence. This is the first volume, titled "Survey articles" and consists exactly of such kind of articles authored by Soviet experts and reviewing briefly the contributions of Soviet mathematicians to a chosen field, during the years from 1917 to 1957.
. The "Mathematics in the USSR during its first forty years 1917–1957" is an opus in two volumes describing the developments of Soviet mathematics during the first forty years of its existence. This is the second volume, titled "Biobibliography" (evidently an acronym for biography and bibliography), containing a complete bibliography of works published by Soviet mathematicians during that time period, alphabetically ordered with respect to author's surname and including, when possible, brief but complete biographies of the authors.
. See also the final version available from the "George Lorentz" section of the Approximation Theory web page at the Mathematics Department of the Ohio State University (retrieved on 25 October 2009).
. The 1941 obituary of Nikolai Günther written by Vladimir Smirnov and Sergei Sobolev, including a list of his mathematical works.
, appendix to the book .

Scientific references
.
. A freely accessible copy is available from the here from the Gröbner Bases Bibliography.

1871 births
1941 deaths
Mathematicians from Saint Petersburg
Corresponding Members of the USSR Academy of Sciences
19th-century mathematicians from the Russian Empire
20th-century Russian mathematicians
Mathematical analysts
PDE theorists